Notocosa is a genus of spiders in the family Lycosidae. It was first described in 2002 by Vink. , it contains only one species, Notocosa bellicosa, found in New Zealand.

References

Lycosidae
Monotypic Araneomorphae genera
Spiders of New Zealand